The Chief of Defence Forces (CDF) is the highest-ranking military officer in the Kenya Defence Forces and the principal military adviser to the President of Kenya and the National Security Council. The CDF outranks all respective heads of each service branch and has operational command authority over the service branches. He leads the meetings and coordinates the efforts of the Service Commander, comprising the CDF, the Commander of the Kenya Army and Kenya Air Force, Kenya Navy and the Commandant of Military Intelligence. The CDF has offices in Ulinzi House. Following the 2010 Constitution, the Chief of the General Staff was replaced with the Chief of the Defence Forces.

Duties 
The office is considered very important and highly prestigious, because the CDF has command authority over the Armed Forces. The chain of command is from the President (as the Commander in Chief), directly to the CDF. The CDF, as a Principal Adviser, does have authority over personnel assignments and oversight over resources and personnel allocated to the commands within the respective services. The Chairman may also transmit communications to the service commanders from the President. He also performs all other functions as assigned from time to time by the President. The CDF may also allocate those duties and responsibilities to other officers under his name.

List of chiefs

Chief of the General Staff

|-style="text-align:center;"

Chief of the Defence Forces

Citations

References

 

Military of Kenya
Kenya